Srbjani  is a village in the municipality of Kičevo, North Macedonia. It used to be part of the former Drugovo Municipality.

Demographics
As of the 2021 census, Srbjani had 518 residents with the following ethnic composition:
Macedonians 288
Turks 139
Albanians 61
Persons for whom data are taken from administrative sources 28
Others 2

According to the 2002 census, the village had a total of 495 inhabitants. Ethnic groups in the village include:
Macedonians 281
Turks 164
Albanians 47
Others 3

References

External links

Villages in Kičevo Municipality